is one of the leading pop artists of postwar Japan, and has been active as multi-genre artist since the 1960s as a graphic designer, illustrator, video artist and fine artist.

Biography

Keiichi Tanaami was born in 1936 as the eldest son of a textile wholesaler in Tokyo. He was 9 years old when Tokyo was bombed during the Great Tokyo Air Raid of World War II in 1945. Images seared into the back of his mind at this time would become major motifs in his art works: roaring American bombers, searchlights scanning the skies, firebombs dropped from planes, the city a sea of fire, fleeing masses, and his father's deformed goldfish swimming in its tank, flashes from the bombs reflecting in the water.

"I was rushed away from my childhood, a time that should be filled with eating and playing, by the enigmatic monstrosity of war; my dreams were a vortex of fear and anxiety, anger and resignation. On the night of the air raid, I remember watching swarms of people flee from bald mountaintops. But then something occurs to me: was that moment real? Dream and reality are all mixed up in my memories, recorded permanently in this ambiguous way."

Tanaami took to drawing from a young age, and as a junior high school student he often spent time at the studio of leading postwar cartoonist Kazushi Hara with the intention of becoming a cartoonist himself. After Hara's sudden death, however, he turned to the pioneering field within manga of graphic novels, and went on to study to become a professional artist at Musashino Art University. Word of his talent spread quickly during his time there and in 1958, as a second year student, he was awarded the Special Selection at an exhibition held by the authoritative illustration and design group of the time. After graduating he took a job with an advertising agency, but quit before one year was up due to the numerous private commissions he was receiving. During the '60s he busied himself as a successful illustrator and graphic designer while also actively participating in the Neo-Dada organization, one of the defining art movements of postwar Japan. In the latter half of the '60s he immersed himself in making video art, the newest medium in the art scene at the time.

"In the 1960s, the Sogetsu Art Center in Akasaka regularly held events that traversed many diverse genres. There were happenings staged by Yoko Ono, videos by Nam June Paik and experimental films from America. It was around that time that I heard about the [Sogetsu] Animation Festival (1965). I wanted so badly to make an animation, so I convinced Yōji Kuri's Experimental Animation Studio to help me create 'Marionettes in Masks' (35 mm, 8 minutes). I continued to make animations after that, with works such as 'Good-by Marilyn' (1971), 'Good-by Elvis and USA' (1971), 'Crayon Angel' (1975) and 'Sweet Friday' (1975)."

In 1967, Tanaami took his first trip to New York City. There he came face to face with the works of Andy Warhol, shining brightly amidst the whirlwind of prospering American consumerism, and Tanaami was struck by the new possibilities of art within the world of design.

"Warhol was in the process of shifting from commercial illustrator to artist, and I both witnessed and experienced firsthand his tactics, his method of incision into the art world. His strategies were identical to the strategies employed by advertising agencies. He used contemporary icons as motifs in his works and for his other activities put together media such as films, newspapers and rock bands. In other words, Warhol's sole existence was selling his works to the art market. I was shocked by this, and at the same time I embraced him as the perfect role model for myself. Like Warhol, I decided not to limit myself to one medium, to fine art or design only, but instead to explore many different methods."

At the height of psychedelic culture and pop art, Tanaami's kitschy, colorful illustrations and design work received high acclaim in both Japan and abroad. "NO MORE WAR", his prize-winning piece from the 1968 antiwar poster contest organized by AVANT-GARDE Magazine, in addition to his album cover art for legendary bands The Monkees and Jefferson Airplane and other such works left a major footprint on the path to introducing psychedelic and pop art to Japan. Furthermore, his series of erotic paintings featuring Hollywood actresses done in the early '70s became an important body of work that declared Tanaami as the Japanese artist with a witty eye on American culture.

In 1975, Tanaami became the first art director of the Japanese edition of Playboy, Monthly Playboy, and went to New York once again to visit Playboy's head office. The editor there took him to Andy Warhol's Factory. Tanaami's works from this period, mostly in the mediums of film and print, were provocative and experimental. His films in particular received wide critical acclaim, appearing in the International Short Film Festival Oberhausen in Germany (1975, 1976), the New York Film Festival (1976), and the Ottawa International Animation Festival in Canada (1976). The vanguard nature of his work led the police to shut down his 1976 exhibit "Super Orange of Love" at Nishimura Gallery for inspection on the opening day.

In 1981, at the age of 45, he suffered a pulmonary edema and for a time hovered at the edge of life and death. Throughout the '80s and '90s, Tanaami created many works centered around the theme of "Life and Death" based on the experience. For example, the pine tree form that appears frequently in Tanaami's works comes from a hallucination he experienced during his illness. Similarly, the cranes, elephants and naked women that appear along with spirals and miniature garden-like architectural forms are characteristic of his works from this period.

In 1999, a retrospective of Tanaami's works from the '60s was held at Gallery 360° in Tokyo. The exhibit was praised highly by Yamataka Eye (Boredoms) and KAWS, cultural leaders of the new generation born after the '60s, and as a result, Tanaami's works once again became popular amongst youth culture. Since 2005, Tanaami has been presenting new works that fall in the realm of fine art. In these works, he continues to manifest images from his personal memories and from his dream world—personified goldfish, deformed characters, rays of light, helical pine trees, fantastical architecture, young girls—through the various mediums of painting, sculpture, film and furniture.

Tanaami has worked as a professor at Kyoto University of Art and Design since 1991, where he has helped bring up young new artists such as Tabaimo. Recent exhibits include "Day Tripper" at Art & Public in Geneva (2007), "SPIRAL" at Galerie Gebr. Lehmann in Berlin (2008), "Kochuten" at NANZUKA UNDERGROUND (2009), "Still in Dream" at Frieze Art Fair (2010) and "No More War" at Art 42 Basel (2011).

Solo exhibitions
1958 "Metallic Art for Open-air Murals", Muramatsu Gallery, Tokyo
1959 "Formative Art of Light by Metallic Art", Ginza Sato Gallery, Tokyo
1965 "Keiichi Tanaami - SERIES ORDER MADE", Tsubaki Kindai Gallery, Tokyo
1970 "Commercial Graphic", Gallery Melton, Canada
1971 "Keiichi Tanaami - CELLULOID BORN IN AMERICA", Gallery Décor, Tokyo
1971 "Cinema Demonstration", Sogetsu Hall, Tokyo
1972 "Films by Keiichi Tanaami", Tenjo-Sajiki-kan, Tokyo
1972 "Clockwork Marilyn", Gallery Décor, Tokyo
1974 "SUPER ORANGE OF LOVE SERIES", Nishimura Gallery, Tokyo
1976 "YOUSHIKEI (Infantile Landscape)", Nishimura Gallery, Tokyo
1977 "BOENKYO (The Mirror of Forgetting Childhood)" Serigraphy, Ao Gallery, Tokyo
1979 "ANOTHER PARADISE OF ARTIFICE SERIES", Ao Gallery, Tokyo
1980 "GIKEIZUKAN (The Illustrated Book of Artificial View) SERIES", Gallery Vivant, Tokyo
1984 "BURNING IN THE EVENING SERIES", Gallery Vivant, Tokyo
1985 "HYAKKA RYORAN (Bright With All Sorts of Flowers) – Keiichi Tanaami 60's Poster Exhibition", Gallery 360°, Tokyo
1986 "THE HOLLYWOOD STARDUST", Gallery 360°, Yurakucho Seibu Marion, Tokyo
1986 "The World of Keiichi Tanaami - PASSAGE IN THE AIR", Shibuya Seibu Seed Hall, Tokyo
1987 "Keiichi Tanaami", Annecy Chateau Museum, France
1987 "THE HOUSE IN ACSENTION", Plus Minus Gallery, Tokyo
1989 "New Works of Keiichi Tanaami - LAW OF THE FOREST", Shibuya Seibu Seed Hall, Tokyo
1990 "LAW OF THE FOREST", Seibu Hall, Shiga
1991 "SPIRAL FOREST-2", Nogizaka Art Hall, Tokyo
1991 "Keiichi Tanaami Print Exhibition - CELEBLATION OF THE FOREST", Muramatsu Gallery, Tokyo
1992 "The World of Keiichi Tanaami", Ikeda 20th Century Museum, Shizuoka
1994 "Keiichi Tanaami-Works of Print 1967-1994", Kawasaki City Museum, Kanagawa
1994 "Keiichi Tanaami's Film-Image of Memory", AV Hall, Kawasaki City Museum, Kanagawa
1995 "Keiichi Tanaami Print Exhibition-Resembling", Gallery Vivant, Tokyo
1995 "Keiichi Tanaami Print Exhibition-Travel for Memories", Bokushin Gallery, Tokyo
1996 "Keiichi Tannami-100 Prints", Chukyo University C-Square, Nagoya
1998 "Variation by Dry-Point", Gallery Vivant, Tokyo
2000 "Keiichi Tanaami Graphic Works in the 60's", Gallery 360°, Tokyo
2001 "Keiichi Tanaami BLOW UP Launch Exhibition", Gallery 360°, Tokyo
2001 "Goldfish Exhibition by Keiichi Tanaami", Tokyo International Forum・Exhibition space, Tokyo
2002 "Tactile Sensibility of the Age-Keiichi Tanaami Graphic Works 1967-2002", D's Gallery, Kyoto University of Art and Design, Kyoto
2002 "Keiichi Tanaami 3000 Drawings", Gallery 360°, Tokyo
2002 "Keiichi Tanaami-Goldfish Lurking in a Glorious View", graf media gm, Osaka
2002 "Keiichi Tanaami-Legends of Volupte 1971-2002", Uplink Factory, Tokyo
2003 "Collage of FLOWERS by Keiichi Tanaami", Art Space Eumeria, Tokyo
2003 "Keiichi Tanaami-GET BACK", Gallery 360°, Tokyo
2004 "DISCO UNIVERSITY with Naohiro Ukawa", KPO Kirin Plaza Osaka, Japan
2004 "TANAAMI'S BEAUTY PARADE", Naruyama Gallery, Tokyo
2004 "Keiichi Tanaami – Ascension Furniture", graf media gm, Osaka
2004 "Keiichi Tanaami - Ascension Furniture + Fantastic City", EX'REALM, Tokyo
2004 "Keiichi Tanaami – Big Playground City", IDEE, Kyoto
2005 Solo Exhibition, Transplant Gallery, New York
2005 "Films of Keiichi Tanaami and Graphic 100", the Norwegian International Film Festival, Norway
2006 "TANAAMISM", Ginza Graphic Gallery, Tokyo
2006 "Layers of Keiichi Tanaami", Gallery AUBE, Kyoto University of Art and Design, Kyoto
2006 "Keiichi Tanaami – KAMON", Paul Smith 9 Albemarls Street Shop, London
2007 "DAYDREAM", NANZUKA UNDERGROUND, Tokyo
2008 "Spiral", Galerie Gebr. Lehmann, Berlin
2008 "COLORFUL", NANZUKA UNDERGROUND, Tokyo
2008 "DAYTRIPPER", Art & Public –Cabinet PH, Geneva
2009 "Kochuten", NANZUKA UNDERGROUND
2009 "SPIRAL 2", Galerie Gebr. Lehmann, Dresden /Berlin
2009 "KANNOOON", NANZUKA UNDERGROUND
2010 "Wander in The Chaos World - Keiichi Tanaami's Fantastic World - ", The OCT Art & Design Gallery, Shennan, China
2010 "Frieze Art Fair", NANZUKA UNDERGROUND
2011 "Art BASEL", NANZUKA UNDERGROUND
2017 "Land of Mirrors", Gary Tatintsian Gallery, Moscow

Bibliography

Books of Paintings
1963 "Tamago-gata (Egg Shape)", Modern Art Center
1966 "Portrait of Keiichi Tanaami", Private Press
1969 "Kyozo Mirai Zukan (Illustrated Book of Imaginary Tomorrow)", Coauthor: Eizaburo Hara, Bronze-sha
1974 "The World of Keiichi Tanaami", Rippu Shobo
1984 "Keiichi Tanaami 1979-1984", Private Press
1986 "Passage in the Air; Paradise of Keiichi Tanaami", Shuei-sha
1989 "Law of the Forest", Fuso-sha
1990 "The Work of Keiichi Tanaami", Sano Gallery
1991 "Blessing of the Forest", Sano Gallery
1992 "100 Images", Tom's Box
1994 "Keiichi Tanaami-Works of Print; 1967-1994", Kawasaki City Museum
"Hollywood Stardust", Sanshindo Publishing
"Travel for Memories", Sanshindo Publishing
2001 "BLOW UP", Seigen-sha Art Publishing
2002 "AMIGOS", Gallery 360°
"KINGYO", Amus Arts Press
2004 "BLOW UP 2", Seigen-sha Art Publishing
"Dream and Memory", Studio Warp
"Portrait of Keiichi Tanaami" (1966) Reprinted Edition, Keiichi Tanaami Design Studio
"Keiichi Tanaami – Hyakka Kyoran", PRINTS 21
2005 "spiral", Seigen-sha Art Publishing
2006 "KAMON", KING OF MOUNTAIN
"Keiichi Tanaami ggg Books 76", Ginza Graphic Gallery-Trans Art
"Layers of Keiichi Tanaami", Kyoto University of Art and Design
2007 "DAYDREAM", Graphic-sha
2008 "colorful", Nanzuka underground
2009 "Kochuten", Nanzuka underground
2014 "Birth and Death Bridge", United Dead Artists

Books of Prints
1971	"Celluloid Borin In America", Gallery Décor, Tokyo
1974	"Pan Cake for Breakfast", Rippu Shobo
1986	"Hollywood Stardust", Image Forum
1990	"Spiral Forest", Private Press
1991	"Celebration of the Forest", Sano Gallery
1998	"Variation", Galerie Vivant

Essay on Films
1978	"Cine Market of Keiichi Tanaami; Artificial Paradise", Hachiyo-sha

Joint Authorship
1996	"100 M Sightseeing – Ideas for Information Design" Coauthor: Masako Inada, Chikuma shobo

Exhibition Catalogue
1975	"Far From the Film – Keiichi Tanaami", Image Forum
1991	"Spiral Forest 2", Nogizaka Art Hall
1992	"The World of Keiichi Tanaami", Ikeda 20th Century Museum
1994	"Keiichi Tanaami – Works of Drawing and Print", Irodori Museum
2002	"Keiichi Tanaami – Animation Catalogue",　Research Center for Information Design, Kyoto University of Art and Design
2004	"Weekly TANAAMI", Keibun-sha Ichijoji-ten

Editorial Design/Art Direction
1998－2000 "Series: Information Design", Edit: Kyoto University of Art and Design, Kadokawa Shoten Publishing

DVD
2002	"TANAAMISM – Magician of Film 1975-2002, Broadway
2002   "TANAAMISM 2 – Visual Epicureanism 1971-2003, Broadway
2003	"TANAAMISM"〔DVDBOX〕, Broadway
2004	"SCRAP DIARY+ANIMACTIONS!!, CREAGE

Film works
1971  "JAM POT" 16mm color 24mins
"GREEN・RED" 16mm color 12mins
"SHE" 16mm color 8mins
"PUSSY"(2 sides) 16mm color 12mins
"RAINBOW・SCENE"(3 sides) 16mm color 11mins
1973 "U.F.O" 16mm color 4mins
1974 "SWEET TOUCH OF LOVE" 16mm color 3mins
"GET BACK ON THE HILL" 16mm color 12mins
1975   "4・EYES" 16mm color 9mins
"WHY" 16mm color 10mins30sec
"SHOOT THE MOON" 16mm color 8mins
"SPECTACLE" 16mm color 16mins50sec
"PHOTOGRAPHS AND MEMORIES" 16mm color 23mins
"LOOK AT THE WOOD" 16mm color 12mins
"Artificial Paradise" 16mm color 14mins
"Human Events" 16mm color 5mins
1976 "Casa Blanca" 16mm color 9mins42sec
1977 "Jekyll and Hyde" 16mm color 13mins
1978 "Frankenstein" 16mm color 11mins
"YOUSHI KEI (Prologue)" 16mm color 11mins12sec
"YOUSHI KEI (Preview)" 16mm color 3mins
1979 "YOUSHI KEI (Another Rainbow City)" 16mm color 17mins17sec
1980 "Darkness Luring a Faint" 16mm color 27mins
1981 "Ryogu-Saishoku" 16mm color 15mins
1984 "Dream Shape Records" 16mm color 30mins
2002 "WHY Re-mix 2002" DV color 3mins20sec

Animation Works
1965 "Marionettes in Masks" 35mm color 8mins
1966 "Women"(Co-produced with Shigetaka Sawada) 35mm color 7mins
1971 "GOOD-BY MARILYN" 16mm color 4mina52sec
"GOOD-BY ELVIS and USA" 16mm color 7mins
"FLICKER LOVE NO.1" 16mm color 4mins
"COMMERCIAL WAR" 16mm color 4mins30sec
1973 "Oh Yoko!" 16mm color 4mins
1975 "Gentle Friday" 16mm color 3mins
"CRAYON ANGEL" 16mm color 3mins
2000 "Dark Memories/Shadows of Dream" 16mm color 4mins
2001 "Breath of Window (Correspondence by Animation)"　16mm color 4mins
2002 "Scrap Diary" 16mm B&W 4mins
"Gaze in the Summer – 1942" 16mm color 4mins
"Memories (Scene of the Childhood)" 16mm color 3mins15sec
"Walking Man" 16mm color 6mins
"GOLDFISH FETISH" DV color 6mins
2003 "PUZZLE OF AUTUMN" DV color 8mins
"FETISH DOLL" 16mm color 6mins
"Portrait of Keiichi Tanaami" DV color 6mins
2004 "LANDSCAPE"　16mm color 4mins25sec
"Ten Nights' Dreams" 16mm color 6mins
2005 "TRIP" 16mm color 4mins30sec
"Madonna's Temptation"　16mm color 4mins
"BLOW UP 2" DV color 8mins
"４・EYES　Re-Mix 2005"　DV color 7mins
"MADONNA" DV color 5mins
"The Harmonic Gleam Vibration" DV color 10mins
2006 "NOISE" 16mm color 8mins50sec
2007 "INCH-HIGH SAMURAI" 16mm color 4mins35sec
2008 "DE CHIRICO" 16mm color 4mins30sec
2009 "SHUNGA" 16mm color 4mins30sec

References

External links
 Rolling 60s Keiichi Tanaami (Japanese)

Contemporary painters
Japanese painters
1936 births
Psychedelic artists
Living people
Japanese video artists
Japanese contemporary artists